Clown Core (stylized as ClownC0re) is an American musical duo. It is composed of two artists who wear clown masks in their Youtube videos: drummer Louis Cole of the indietronica/jazzfunk band Knower and an accompanying saxophonist. The saxophonist has been speculated to be Sam Gendel, a musician who has performed with Knower. Their eponymous album Clown Core was released in 2010 and also appeared on Spotify. The album Toilet followed eight years later. Van appeared in 2020. Their albums are all self-released.

Reception 

Celia Woitas of the German magazine Metal Hammer described the music as "far removed from any music genre": "In gewohnter Kloatmosphäre (...) spielen ihren sehr eigenen Musikmix, der sich fernab von jedem Musikgenre befindet". In his review of the song "Hell" (2018) and analysis of the accompanying music video, Axl Rosenberg of heavy metal news website MetalSucks called the project "a masterpiece of modern art" and described the song as "genre-defying". Mick R. of New Noise Magazine shared the latter view: "Clown Core simply defies categorization."

Discography 

 Clown Core (2010)
 Toilet (2018)
 Van (2020)
 1234 (2021)

References

External links 
 
 

Translated pages
Musical duos
Avant-garde music groups